Fibroblast growth factor receptor substrate 3 is a protein that in humans is encoded by the FRS3 gene.

The protein encoded by this gene is a substrate for the fibroblast growth factor receptor. It is found in peripheral plasma membrane and functions in linking FGF receptor stimulation to activators of Ras.

References

Further reading